Anderson Lago Zeze (born July 13, 1989) is an Ivorian footballer who plays as a midfielder and can be used as a winger .

Career 
Zeze began his career with the Académie de Sol Beni the youth academy of ASEC Mimosas and signed on 1 August 2008 a contract for SK Kladno, his first professional game was on 28 October 2008 against 1. FC Brno of the Gambrinus liga, the top league in the Czech Republic.

International 
In 2008 Zeze was called up to a training camp with the Côte d'Ivoire under-20 national

References

External links
 http://www.sport-ivoire.ci/football/?p=1&id=7930
 http://www.footmercato.net/joueur/j65134_anderson-lago-zeze
 http://sofifa.com/fr/fifa10/player/148561-anderson-lago-zeze

1989 births
Living people
Ivorian footballers
Czech First League players
SK Kladno players
FK Viktoria Žižkov players
Expatriate footballers in the Czech Republic
Ivorian expatriates in the Czech Republic
CD Laudio players
Footballers from Abidjan
Association football midfielders